Kaahin Kissii Roz is an Indian thriller television series that was broadcast on Star Plus from 23 April 2001 to 23 September 2004. It is digitally available on Disney+ Hotstar. The series starred Mouli Ganguly, Yash Tonk and Sudha Chandran in the lead roles.

Plot summary

The Past
Shaina marries Kunal Sikand and enters the rich, high-profile Sikand family. After marriage the entire family, including Shaina, is haunted by the spirit of a woman who usually leaves a red cloth around. The spirit is revealed to be of Kunal's ex-wife Sunaina, who died mysteriously four years ago. In a twist, it is revealed that Shaina is in fact Sunaina, who had plastic surgery. She married Kunal to take revenge as she thinks he tried to kill her. Kunal is then revealed to have been innocent all along. It was in fact her mother-in-law, Ramola Sikand, who tried to kill Sunaina. Thus a cold war begins between Ramola and Shaina.

Kunal's stepbrother Anish, who is Ramola's son, is married to Nisha and is cold towards Shaina. Kunal's youngest stepbrother Nakul is engaged to Surbhi. She commits suicide after finding out about her pregnancy and Nakul leaves the country. Natasha, Avantika and Malvika are the Sikand daughters and sisters of Kunal, Anish and Nakul. Aman got engaged with Natasha Sikand, however due to mismatch of both of their Kundali, Aman broke the engagement, and eventually Natasha marries Akash. Avantika and Malvika marry Aman's brothers and move out of Sikand household. Nakul eventually returns and marries Sunidhi.

Shaina digs out Ramola's past life and finds Kunal's real mother is actually Nirupa. She is in an asylum. Ramola gave drugs (Kairoxin) to make Nirupa mentally ill and then tricked Kunal's father into marrying her to get his entire property. Shaina brings Nirupa home and starts taking care of her and makes her well but frustrates Ramola in the process. Ramola decides to take revenge and tries to shoot Shaina in the temple after which Ramola's true face is revealed to Kunal. Kunal decides to replace Ramola Sikand and take all their ownership of Sikand group of companies. Ramola kills Kunal by pushing a breakfree car towards him. Ramola brings Kunal's look-alike, Kuljeet, from Haryana to replace Kunal in the Sikand household and the business. Kunal, who has managed to survive, loses his memory and ends up joining a criminal organisation renaming himself Shaan. Shaan and his cohorts find Kuljeet in a temple and kidnap him so that Shaan can enter the Sikand household. Kunal enters the Sikand family and gradually regains his memory and joins forces with Shaina to destroy Ramola.

Kuljeet was deeply in love with Sikand family, especially Shaina, so he tried his best to prove Kunal wrong. Finally Kunal proves that he is the real Kunal and Kuljeet returns to Haryana. Ramola and Kunal compromise by hiding each other's sins, Ramola trying to kill Kunal and Kunal being Shaan, a Criminal.

Maansi - Transition of Sunaina to Shaina
Karan Seth enters the Sikand Household and claims Shaina is actually Maansi. The fact is, when Sunaina was burnt, she lived with her burnt face for one year and then met Maansi. They were traveling together and met an accident. Maansi was killed in the accident, and mistakenly Sunaina's face was changed to Maansi's face, the present face of Shaina. Kunal loses his faith on Shaina and he believes she is Maansi. Shaina had made a will stating the property would go to a trust if she and Kunal died. Karan Seth was paid by Ramola Sikand to prove that Shaina was Maansi, so that the will was nullified. Karan wanted Maansi's property that she had left to Baba. He kills Baba and proves Kunal guilty of it. Kunal realizes that Shaina is truthful and is not Maansi. Shaina plays Maansi's role to trap Karan and Ramola and to save Kunal. She creates misunderstandings between Karan and Ramola and so Kunal is saved.

Kunal and Shaina Jailed
Ramola brings her criminal brother Ratan and sets up Shaina and Kunal. They are sent to jail for fraud. Kuljeet helps Kunal and Shaina escape from jail and tries to find a way to prove them innocent. Ramola tries her best to find them and hand them over to the police but she fails. Eventually, she finds them hiding in a farmhouse. She sets the farmhouse on fire. Everyone thinks Kunal and Shaina are dead but they have survived and they haunt Ramola, pretending to ghosts. Ramola gets mentally disturbed and is admitted to a mental asylum.

The Revenge
When everything is revealed about Ramola and things begin to settle, Dhananjay(DJ) and his family enter their lives. Years ago Ramola cheated DJ of his inheritance of Sikand property and he is back to take revenge on Ramola. DJ tries to shoot Ramola, but by mistake the bullet hits his own daughter, Devika. DJ and his wife Avanti gets frustrated so they decide to kill the whole Sikand family by planting a bomb. Nakul and Sunidhi dies in the blast and Ramola and Shaina vow revenge on DJ. It is only four years later that DJ finds Kunal still alive. DJ goes after him and creates a lot of destruction in the Sikands' lives. Ramola and Shaina come together to defeat DJ. The Sikands use the alias of Sengupta. Each of them is given their new identity for security purposes. After a long war, Ramola and Shaina succeeds in killing DJ. As DJ takes his last breath, he shoots Ramola in the back. This leaves her paralyzed and she is confined to a wheel chair.

Destruction
Kunal and Shaina are finally convinced that Ramola has changed and is no longer evil. The cold war between Shaina and Nisha begins due to the lack of money in the family account. Somebody tries to kill Shaina, so she blames Anish and Nisha for all mishaps that happened with her. A witch appears everyday and threatens Shaina, new shadows appear and scare her. Shaina insults Anish and Nisha everyday and Kunal gets angry with all the family problems and somebody tries to prove Shaina is mentally ill. Somebody shoots Anish and he goes into coma and Shaina is blamed for that and is jailed. Ramola helps Shaina to escape from jail but in a twist it is revealed that Ramola was behind all the incidents that happened with Shaina. The bullet that hit Anish was meant for Shaina but Anish saw the hitman and in order to protect Shaina he is shot himself. Since Anish is in coma he is unable to reveal anything. Shaina eventually realizes that it was all along Ramola's doing. Nisha is revealed to be under Ramola's influence in plotting against Shaina. Once Anish recovered, Nisha tricked Anish to give statement against Shaina, hence Shaina goes to jail.

Ramola then creates a false affair between Vikram and Shaina to destroy Kunal's faith on Shaina. Kunal misunderstands Shaina and cannot hold himself anymore. Since Nisha was helping Ramola in all the crimes against Shaina, Ramola shot Nisha and falsely framed Shaina for Nisha's murder.

Ramola brings Shalini into the picture to win all hearts in the family and marry Kunal. When she fails, Shalini undergoes plastic surgery and gets Sunaina's (Shaina's previous) face. Shaina fails in all her steps to defeat Ramola. Kuljeet and Daiji returned to help Shaina fight against Ramola Sikand, however, Ramola kills Kuljeet and makes Shaina believe that Kunal was the murderer. Kuljeet becomes paralyzed and Shaina decides to destroy Sikand family. Aditi and Adtiya (children of Kunal and Shaina) helped Shaina to take over Sikand property and enters the Sikand house.

A battle ensues among Shaina (real Sunaina), Shalini (fake Sunaina) and Ramola which results in the death of remaining family members - Anish, Avantika and Shalini (fake Sunaina). Finally Ramola succeeds in killing Shaina and Kunal along with their two children. Thus Ramola is left alone, with almost her entire family dead. The only survivors of the family besides Ramola are Nirupa, Anish and Nisha's daughter, Nisha's mother and two children of Ratan (whom Ramola adopts).

The Next Generation
For the next 20 years Ramola lives a peaceful life raising Ratan's children Rashi and Apoorva as her own. Shaina Sikand is re-incarnated as Devika who lives with her father and aunt. She has always had nightmares of someone trying to kill her. When Ramola learns about Devika she is shocked to see the same face but Devika does not remember anything of her past life. Kunal Sikand is re-incarnated as Nikhil who is born into a poor family. In the temple Devika sees Nikhil and faints. She is taken to a hospital but Nikhil takes her from there to their old farm house. Devika wakes up and remembers everything. Nikhil and Devika decide to marry. At the farmhouse Devika is alone as Nikhil is out. Devika sees a red cloth on a tree and as she goes to take it she finds Ramola's brother Ratan on top of the tree. He throws kerosene on her and burns her alive. After Devika's death Nikhil seeks revenge from Ramola and he takes over as company manager of the Sikand group of industries. Rashi, Apoorva and Nirupa turn against Ramola when they learn the truth of what she did with her family. Anisha enters the story avenge her father's murder from Ramola Sikand. Ramola is trapped from all sides but she disappears and everyone believes her to be dead. Nikhil and Anisha marry. After long time Ramola returns to their life claiming that she is blind.

Showdown
Ramola goes psychotic and kills a couple of inspectors when they try to arrest her. She also kills Nirupa Sikand by pushing her out of the window at an old house. Lastly, Ramola is killed by Nikhil when he shoots her with a gun. Thus Kunal and Shaina exact their revenge.

Cast

 Mouli Ganguly as 
Sunaina Sikand(before Plastic surgery) 
Shaina Sikand (after plastic surgery)
Devika (after rebirth)
 Smita Kalpavriksha as Sunaina Sikand
 Poonam Narula as Sunaina Sikand (Fake Sunaina hired by Ramola Sikand)
 Sudha Chandran as Ramola Sikand 
 Yash Tonk as Kunal Sikand / Shaan (dual role) / Kuljeet / Nikhil (rebirth)
 Manish Khanna as Ratan Raheja (Ramola's brother, father of Apoorva and Raashi)
 Gauri Tonk as Nisha Sikand
 Mazher Sayed as Anish Sikand 
 Hiten Tejwani / Vishal Watwani (2002-2003) as Nakul Sikand
 Kanika Kohli as Sunidhi Nakul Sikand (2002-2003)
 Shweta Salve as Anisha (wife of Nikhil/daughter of ACP Verma)
 Abhilin Pandey as Mohit  
 Sushmita Mukherjee as Avanti Dhananjay Rajpal
 Mohan Kapoor as Dhananjay Rajpal
 Rahil Azam as Karan Seth (Mansi's husband) 
  Rohit Bakshi / Sikandar Kharbanda as Vikram
 Monalika Bhonsle as Avantika Sikand
 Nandita Thakur as Nirupa Sikand
 Kamini Khanna / Ruma Sengupta as Daiji
 Ravee Gupta / Nivedita Bhattacharya as Monica Bose
 Pamela Mukherjee as Malvika Sikand
 Mayuri Kango as Malaika Rajpal
 Amita Chandekar as Shalini (Original) 
 Smita Kalpavriksha Gupta / Poonam Narula as Sunaina Sikand Duplicate (before Plastic surgery) / Fake Sunaina (hired by Ramola)
 Itishree Singh as Surabhi
 Surbhi Tiwari as Bhairavi 
 Sudesh Berry as DJ's partner
 Manish Raisinghan as Apoorva Sikand 
 Naveen Saini as Aman 
 Pawan Chopra as Akash
 Manoj Bidwai as Praveen 
 Puneet Vashisht as Anupam
 Nazneen Patel as Rashi Sikand 
 Darshil Mashru as Aditya 
 Palak Jain as Aditi 
 Dheeraj Sarna as Aseem 
 Kanika Shivpuri as Jasvinder Kaur  
 Abhijeet Khurana as Karan 
 Manini Mishra as Sanya  
 Pratichi Mishra as Mohini  
 Vishal Kotian as Raja
 Gaurav Gera
 Mahesh Kanwal 
 Firdaus Dadi as Nandini (Kuljeet's nurse working for Ramola)
 Saptrishi Ghosh as ACP Verma (after a twenty-year leap, DIG Verma)

Production

Development
The storyline of the series took a twenty-year leap in January 2004.

Casting
In March 2004, lead Mouli Ganguly quit the series stating monotonicity.

Reception

Ratings
The show opened with a low rating of 2.2 TVR in its debut week. But it saw a decline in ratings at its prime slot of 8:00 pm (IST) and thus that slot was taken by Kasautii Zindagii Kay in October 2001 while Kaahin shifted to a late night slot of 11.00 pm (IST). The decision was in show's favor as it became the first show to rake at good ratings ranging more than 5 TVR in that slot, also entering top ten weekly list of most watched Indian programs, which was before considered as a dead slot. In week 45 of 2002, it was at seventh position with 5.94 TVR. However, in September 2003, it was pushed to 11:30 pm (IST) slot after which the ratings of the series decreased the following weeks, garnering 3.4, 3.1 and 2.7 TVR during the following three weeks. Later, it settled down between 3.5 and 4 TVR.

Critics
India Today stated Sudha Chandran's role Ramola Sikand being one of the ideal vamps of Indian television.

Impact
A snacks shop named Bunty Juice Centre at Borivali in Mumbai sold juices with different flavours under the names of Balaji Telefilms soap operas including the series Kaahin Kissi Roz.

Re-Run

The show is re-telecasted on Star Plus since 4 July 2022 at 3:30 PM.

Awards

Indian Telly Awards
 2003; Best Music Director - Lalit Sen
 2003; Best Editor (Fiction) - Diren Singh

References

External links
 Kahin Kisi Roz at Disney+ Hotstar 
 Official Site on STAR Plus
 

Balaji Telefilms television series
Indian television soap operas
StarPlus original programming
2001 Indian television series debuts
2004 Indian television series endings